The last Soviet Union (USSR)-era flag was adopted by the Russian SFSR in 1954 and used until 1991. The flag of the Russian SFSR was a defacement of the flag of the Soviet Union. The constitution stipulated:

Like the flag of the Soviet Union (USSR),  the hammer and sickle represented the working class; more specifically, the hammer represented the urban industrial workers and the sickle represented the rural and agricultural peasants. The red star represented the CPSU and Communism. The red in the flag represented the Russian Revolution and revolution in general. The blue stripe symbolized the wide Russian skies and the waters of its seas and rivers.

History
The first flag of the Russian SFSR, adopted on 14 April 1918, was a flag showing the full name of the recently born Soviet republic before the then imminent Russian spelling reform. Its ratio was unspecified.

From June 1918, the flag was red with the gold Cyrillic characters РСФСР (RSFSR) in the top-left corner, in a traditional Vyaz' style of ornamental Cyrillic calligraphy.

From 1920, the characters was redesigned as described in the Russian Constitution of 1925. However this flag was oftentimes not used, with the 1918 flag being used until 1937.

In February 1947, the Presidium of the Supreme Soviet of the USSR issued a resolution calling for the Soviet republics to adopt new flags. The design was suggested to be based on the state flag of the USSR, as to indicate the idea of the republic within the union, and to include colors and national ornaments to express the geographical, national, historical and cultural characteristics of each republic. In the Russian SFSR, the chairman of the Secretary of the Presidium of the Supreme Soviet  opened the first meeting in next month to redesign the national flag.

On 9 January 1954, the new national flag of the RSFSR was approved by the Decree of the Presidium of the Supreme Soviet of the RSFSR. The flag was designed by artist Valentin Petrovich Viktorov. On 2 June 1954, the description of the flag was included in the Constitution of the RSFSR.

After the events of the attempted coup in Moscow, Boris Yeltsin, the president of the Russian SFSR adopted a resolution that the imperial tricolor flag based on the Russian Empire would be the flag of RSFSR. On 22 August 1991 the Supreme Soviet of the RSFSR decided:

It was first hoisted at 12:00 pm on 22 August 1991 at the White House. A tricolor with the hammer and sickle on the centre was also later proposed.

On 1 November 1991, the Constitution of the RSFSR was amended to adopt the white-azure-scarlet flag as the official national flag.

Proposed flag of the Russian SFSR 

Since the first meeting for creating new national flag of the RFSFR in March 1947, some proposals were sent to the authority. The graphic artist  create a proposal to add white and blue horizontal stripes at the bottom, both two stripes took  of the flag's height. His proposal was submitted to the Secretary of the Presidium of the Supreme Soviet of the USSR Alexander Gorkin in June 1948 and again to the Chairman of the Council of Ministers of the RSFSR Boris Chernousov in December 1949, but was not approved.

Mikhail Rodionov also created another proposal for the state flag of the RSFSR. It consisted of a traditional tricolour flag and a hammer and a sickle in the middle of the flag. Because of his proposal, he was accused of nationalism in 1950, at the Leningrad affair case.

Other Russian SFSR flags
The banner of the republic was a 1:1 ratio red flag with gold fringe, commonly used in ceremonies. The banner was also used on the first inauguration of Boris Yeltsin as President of the Russian SFSR on 10 July 1991.

Colour scheme

Regional flags based on the flag of RSFSR
Flags of the Autonomous Soviet Socialist Republics of RSFSR were defacements of the 1954 flag of RSFSR, with texts or acronyms of the name of the republic in official languages.

See also

Flag of the Soviet Union
Coat of arms of the Russian SFSR
Flag of Russia
List of Russian flags
Defacement (flag)

References

Soviet Federative Socialist Republic
Russian Soviet Federative Socialist Republic
1954 establishments in the Soviet Union
National symbols of Russia
Russian Soviet Federative Socialist Republic